The Weekenders is an American animated television series created by Doug Langdale. The series revolves around four racially diverse 12 year-old 7th graders, Italian-American Tino Tonitini (voiced by Jason Marsden), Scottish-American Lor McQuarrie (voiced by Grey DeLisle), African-American Carver Descartes (voiced by Phil LaMarr), and Lithuanian-Jewish Tish Katsufrakis (voiced by Kath Soucie) who go through having adventures spending the weekend between Friday and Sunday.

The series premiered on February 26, 2000 as part of Disney's One Saturday Morning block along with Recess and Pepper Ann. It also aired on UPN as part of its Disney's One Too block. The show later moved to Toon Disney, where the final episodes aired from October 19, 2003 to February 29, 2004, bringing the total to 39.

Series overview

Episodes

Season 1 (2000)

Season 2 (2000–01)

Season 3 (2001)

Season 4 (2002–04)

External links 
 
 

Weekenders
Lists of Disney Channel television series episodes
Lists of Disney television series episodes